Winogradskyella ulvae is a Gram-negative, facultatively anaerobic, slightly halophilic and motile bacterium from the genus of Winogradskyella which has been isolated from the alga Ulva fenestrata.

References

Flavobacteria
Bacteria described in 2012